The following is a list of films produced in the Tamil film industry in India in 1967, in alphabetical order.

1967

References 

Films, Tamil
Lists of 1967 films by country or language
1967
1960s Tamil-language films